Léonce-Albert Van Peteghem (7 October 1916 – 7 January 2004) was a Belgian Roman Catholic Bishop.   He served as the twenty-eighth Bishop of Ghent between 1964 and 1991: it was an unusually long incumbency.

Life

Early years
Van Peteghem was born a short distance to the north of Ghent, the youngest of his parents' twelve children.   His parents were farm workers.   He spent some of his childhood in nearby Lochristi after his parents relocated to obtain work, and more of it in De Pinte (still in East Flanders) for the same reason.   He received a Classics and Humanities focused education at Sint-Lievenscollege in Ghent, before undertaking higher level studies at the Seminary in Ghent and at the Catholic (Dutch language) University of Leuven.

He was ordained into the priesthood on 18 August 1940.   He obtained a diploma as a Licentiate in Theology from Leuven in 1943.   On 11 September 1943 he was appointed to a professorship in Fundamental Moral Theology at the Main Seminary in Ghent, and it was here that in 1956 he was appointed "Geestelijk Directeur" (literally"Spiritual Director").

During the war years, from 1943 till 1945, he was also employed as sub-regent at the Paul-Adrian VI College in Leuven.   On 31 January 1956 he became a canon of St Bavo's Chapter in Ghent.   On 22 January 1960 he became an ecclesiastical judge in the Bishopric of Ghent, and he was appointed diocesan Vicar general by The Bishop a year later.

The bishop
The Pope appointed him Bishop of Ghent on 28 May 1964.   He was just 47.   He was consecrated in St Bavo's Cathedral by Cardinal Suenens on 29 June 1964.   Van Peteghem took as his episcopal motto "In Deo salutari" ("In God the saviour").   The three crosses on the "episcopal arms" he chose recalled, in part, the village of his birth.

He now participated, for nearly two years, in the work of the Second Vatican Council which had started its deliberations back in October 1962. He would later come to be seen as unsympathetic to some of The Council's more "liberal" outcomes.

On 1 October 1967 he became an honorary canon of St Bavo's Chapter at Ghent's sister bishopric at Haarlem.   Ten years later, in 1977, he issued his own catechism supporting religious education in his diocese.

Retirement
On 13 July 1990 Arthur Luysterman was appointed as Van Peteghem's Coadjutor bishop.

7 October 1991 was his seventy-fifth birthday.   Léonce-Albert Van Peteghem was the first Bishop of Ghent to be affected by the requirements of "Ecclesiae Sanctae", the General Letter ("Motu proprio") of 1966 in which Pope Paul VI had mandated 75 as a retirement age for bishops (and others).   Van Peteghem therefore submitted his resignation on his birthday, and after slightly more than two months, Pope John Paul II accepted it on 27 December 1991.

Death and celebration
Léonce-Albert Van Peteghem died on 7 January 2004 in Ghent.   His funeral took place at St Bavo's on 17 January 2004 in the presence of Cardinal Archbishop Danneels and of the city's Socialist mayor, Frank Beke.   The service was conducted by Bishop Luysterman, and after it was over Van Peteghem's mortal remains were buried in the crypt.

Evaluation
Paying tribute to his own episcopal predecessor Mgr. Arthur Luysterman highlighted Van Peteghem's simplicity, warmth and striking honesty.   Van Peteghem was steadfast in his loyalty to the church and its teachings through the 1960s, a decade of spiritual turbulence and uncertainty.   He was a strong advocate of priests being recognisably and correctly dressed, according to their positions within the church.   He was opposed to priests who reconfigured their church pews in ways that made it impossible to kneel for prayer.

References

External link

1916 births
2004 deaths
20th-century Roman Catholic bishops in Belgium
20th-century Belgian Roman Catholic theologians
Bishops of Ghent